Derma is a town in Calhoun County, Mississippi, United States. The population was 1,025 at the 2010 census.

Geography
Derma is located in south-central Calhoun County at  (33.856531, -89.286384). It is bordered to the west by Calhoun City. Mississippi Highway 8 runs through the center of town, leading west into Calhoun City and east  to Vardaman.

The Yalobusha River, a tributary of the Yazoo River, passes about one mile south of the town.

Demographics

2020 census

As of the 2020 United States Census, there were 957 people, 465 households, and 297 families residing in the town.

2000 census
As of the census of 2000, there were 1,023 people, 374 households, and 287 families residing in the town. The population density was 909.3 people per square mile (349.5/km2). There were 397 housing units at an average density of 352.9 per square mile (135.6/km2). The racial makeup of the town was 57.67% African American, 41.45% White, 0.10% Native American, 0.10% Pacific Islander, 0.10% from other races, and 0.59% from two or more races. Hispanic or Latino of any race were 0.39% of the population.

There were 374 households, out of which 40.6% had children under the age of 18 living with them, 47.1% were married couples living together, 24.6% had a female householder with no husband present, and 23.0% were non-families. 22.2% of all households were made up of individuals, and 10.4% had someone living alone who was 65 years of age or older. The average household size was 2.74 and the average family size was 3.20.

In the town, the population was spread out, with 31.3% under the age of 18, 8.8% from 18 to 24, 28.8% from 25 to 44, 19.5% from 45 to 64, and 11.6% who were 65 years of age or older. The median age was 32 years. For every 100 females, there were 80.1 males. For every 100 females age 18 and over, there were 74.0 males.

The median income for a household in the town was $22,344, and the median income for a family was $31,000. Males had a median income of $22,130 versus $16,364 for females. The per capita income for the town was $14,274. About 17.6% of families and 18.6% of the population were below the poverty line, including 23.8% of those under age 18 and 20.3% of those age 65 or over.

Education
Derma is served by the Calhoun County School District.

Notable natives
 Glenn Hardin, Olympic gold medalist

References

Towns in Calhoun County, Mississippi
Towns in Mississippi